is a national highway of Japan connecting Aoba-ku, Sendai and Aomori, Aomori. Alongside Japan National Route 6, it is a main route along the Pacific coast of eastern Japan. It is paralleled closely by the incomplete Sanriku Expressway between Sendai and Hachinohe.

Route description

The northernmost  of the highway between its northern terminus in central Aomori and Japan National Route 102 in Towada, Aomori is a concurrency with Japan National Route 4 where Route 45 is not signed until it diverges from Route 4. From there it independently begins heading southeast towards the coastal cities of Hachinohe, Kuji, Miyako, Kamaishi, Kesennuma, and Ishinomaki on the way to its southern terminus in Sendai.

History

Route 45 was originally designated on 18 May 1953 as second-class routes 102 and 111 connecting Hirosaki to Hachinohe and Hachinohe to Sendai, respectively. On 1 April 1963, Route 102 was truncated to its current route with the section between Towada and Hachinohe incorporated into the newly formed first-class Route 45 along with the entirety of Route 111.

Many sections of the highway along the Sanriku Coast were inundated, destroyed, or swept away by the 2011 Tōhoku earthquake and tsunami event.

List of major junctions

Aomori Prefecture
 in Aomori (northern end of concurrency with )
 in Aomori
 in Aomori
 in Noheji
 (Noheji Interchange) in Noheji
 in Shichinohe
 in Towada (southern end of concurrency with )
 in Towada
 Momoishi Road/Daini Michinoku Toll Road (Shimoda-Momoishi Interchange) in Oirase
 in Oirase
 Hachinohe Expressway (Hachinohe-kita Interchange) in Hachinohe
 in Hachinohe
 in Hachinohe
 Hachinohe-Kuji Expressway (Hachinohe-minami Interchange) in Hachinohe
 Hachinohe-Kuji Expressway (Hashikami Interchange) in Hashikami
Iwate Prefecture
/ Hachinohe-Kuji Expressway (Kuji-kita Interchange) in Kuji
/ Hachinohe-Kuji Expressway/Sanriku-kita Jūkan Road (Kuji Interchange) in Kuji
 in Kuji
 Sanriku-kita Jūkan Road (Fudai-dai-16-Chiwari Interchange) in Fudai
 Sanriku-kita Jūkan Road (Fudai-dai-11-Chiwari Interchange) in Fudai
 Sanriku-kita Jūkan Road (Tanohata-Sugō Interchange) in Tanohata
 Sanriku-kita Jūkan Road (Tanohata Interchange) in Tanohata
 Sanriku-kita Jūkan Road (Tanohata-minami Interchange) in Tanohata
 Sanriku-kita Jūkan Road (Unosudangai Interchange) in Tanohata
 in Iwaizumi
 Sanriku-kita Jūkan Road (Iwaizumi-minami Interchange) in Iwaizumi
 Sanriku Expressway (Tarō-Masakikaigan Interchange) in Miyako
 in Miyako
 Sanriku Expressway (Miyako-minami Interchange) in Miyako
 Sanriku Expressway (Yamada-kita Interchange) in Yamada
 Sanriku Expressway (Yamada Interchange) in Yamada
 Sanriku Expressway (Yamada-minami Interchange) in Yamada
 Sanriku Expressway (Kamaishi-kita Interchange) in Kamaishi
 in Kamaishi
 Sanriku Expressway (Kamaishi-Tōni Interchange) in Kamaishi
 Sanriku Expressway (Kamaishi-minami Interchange) in Kamaishi
 Sanriku Expressway (Yoshihama Interchange) in Ōfunato
 Sanriku Expressway (Sanriku Interchange) in Ōfunato
 Sanriku Expressway (Ōfunato-kita Interchange) in Ōfunato
 Sanriku Expressway (Ōfunato Interchange) in Ōfunato
 in Ōfunato
 Sanriku Expressway (Ōfunato-Goishikaigan Interchange) in Ōfunato
 Sanriku Expressway (Kayooka Interchange) in Rikuzentakata
 in Rikuzentakata
 Sanriku Expressway (Rikuzentakata-Taosabe Interchange) in Rikuzentakata
Miyagi Prefecture
 Sanriku Expressway (Karakuwa-Goharagi Interchange) in Kesennuma
 Sanriku Expressway (Karakuwa-minami Interchange) in Kesennuma
 in Kesennuma
 Sanriku Expressway (Kesennuma-chūō Interchange) in Kesennuma
 Sanriku Expressway (Ōya-Kaigan Interchange) in Kesennuma
 in Kesennuma
 Sanriku Expressway (Motoyoshitsuya Interchange) in Kesennuma
 Sanriku Expressway (Koizumi-Kaigan Interchange) in Kesennuma
 Sanriku Expressway (Utatsu-kita Interchange) in Minamisanriku
 Sanriku Expressway (Utatsu Interchange) in Minamisanriku
 Sanriku Expressway (Minamisanriku-Kaigan Interchange) in Minamisanriku
 in Minamisanriku
 in Tome
 Sanriku Expressway (Kahoku Interchange) in Ishinomaki
 in Ishinomaki
 in Ishinomaki
 in Ishinomaki
 Sanriku Expressway (Naruse-Okumatsushima Interchange) in Higashimatsushima
 in Matsushima
 Sanriku Expressway/Sendai-Tōbu Road (Sendaikō-kita Interchange) in Miyagino-ku, Sendai
 in Miyagino-ku, Sendai
 in Aoba-ku, Sendai

Japan National Route 111
 
 is a former second-class national highway of Japan that ran north to south from Sendai to Hachinohe. It existed from 1953 to 1963, when it was incorporated into the newly formed and longer first-class Route 45.

References

External links 

045
Roads in Aomori Prefecture
Roads in Iwate Prefecture
Roads in Miyagi Prefecture